Stanislav Yevgenyevich Pukhov (born 28 June 1977 in Moscow) is a Russian badminton player. He is a five-time national champion in the men's singles (1998, 2001, 2003, 2005, and 2007), and also, defeated France's Arif Rasidi for the championship title and a consolation prize of $10,000 in the same division at the 2005 French Open in Paris.

Pukhov qualified for the men's singles at the 2008 Summer Olympics in Beijing, after he was ranked sixtieth in the world by the Badminton World Federation. He received a bye for the second preliminary round before losing out to Lithuania's Kęstutis Navickas, with a score of 12–21 and 17–21.

Achievements

BWF Grand Prix (1 title, 2 runners-up) 
The BWF Grand Prix has two level such as Grand Prix and Grand Prix Gold. It is a series of badminton tournaments, sanctioned by Badminton World Federation (BWF) since 2007. The World Badminton Grand Prix sanctioned by International Badminton Federation (IBF) since 1983.

Men's singles

 BWF Grand Prix Gold tournament
 BWF & IBF Grand Prix tournament

BWF International Challenge/Series (13 titles, 7 runners-up)
Men's singles

Men's doubles

 BWF International Challenge tournament
 BWF International Series tournament
 BWF Future Series tournament

References

External links
NBC 2008 Olympics profile

1977 births
Living people
Badminton players from Moscow
Russian male badminton players
Olympic badminton players of Russia
Badminton players at the 2008 Summer Olympics